Tarek Ehlail (born 31 August 1981 in Homburg, Germany) is a German film director, screenwriter and film producer.

Life 
Ehlail, son of a Palestinian father and German mother, became as teenager a punk and worked for about 10 years as body piercer. In 2003 he started the production company Sabotakt which produced mainly special underground projects and independent films. Together with Matthias Lange Ehlail found the first German 'Punkfightclub', the Sabotakt Boxparty, a punk and martial arts event which toured through Europe.

Work 
In 2008 Tarek Ehlail produced together with Matthias Lange his debut film Chaostage - We are Punks! starring Ben Becker, Martin Semmelrogge, Ralf Richter, Stipe Erceg, Claude-Oliver Rudolph, Helge Schneider and Uwe Fellensiek. The Saarlandmedien supported 2009 his cinema film Gegengerade – Niemand siegt am Millerntor about the FC St. Pauli. The film cast included Mario Adorf, Moritz Bleibtreu and Fabian Busch and was selected into the competition at the 'Filmfestival Max Ophüls Preis' in 2011. In 2011 and 2012 the documentaries  Alles in Allem about a tour of the electro band Egotronic and GLAUBENSKRIEGER about the annual Internationalen Soldatenwallfahrt to Lourdes were produced by Ehlail.

In March 2013 Ehlail published his first book Piercing is not a crime (Schwarzkopf & Schwarzkopf publisher). The book tells 33 anecdotes from the time when Ehlail worked as tattoo artist. The book cover shows him together with the tattoo model Lexy Hell.

Ehlails movie Volt, a science fiction drama, is filmed 2015 as German-French co-production by augenschein-Filmproduktion and Les Films D’Antoine around Cologne and supported by the German Federal Film Board. The cast includes Ayọ (Joy Ogunmakin), Benno Fürmann, Denis Moschitto and Stipe Erceg.

Filmography (selection)

Films 
 Chaostage – We Are Punks! (2007/2008)
 Gegengerade – Niemand siegt am Millerntor (2011)
 Volt (2015, in production)

Documentaries 
 Don´t panic it´s only war … (2003)
 Bonobo - Die Sabotakt Reise um die Welt (2004)
 Deutschlands Golden Boy (story of German boxer René Weller, 2005)
 Alles in Allem Egotronic Tourfilm (2011)
 GLAUBENSKRIEGER (2013)

Music videos 
 Produzenten der Froide: R´n R Schwindel (2008)
 Nyze feat. Bushido (2009)
 D-Bo: Frust (2009)
 Nyze: Easy (2009)
 D-Bo: Diskothek (2009)
 Kay One: Ich brech die Herzen (2010)
 Slime: Gewinnen werden immer wir (2010)
 Egotronic: Hamburg soll brennen (2010)
 Johnny Mauser: Die Mauer (2013)

References

External links
 
 Official Website of Sabotakt
 Glaubenskrieger

1981 births
Film people from Saarland
Living people
People from Homburg, Saarland